Christine Weason is a former member of the Arizona House of Representatives. He served in the House from January 1997 through January 2003, serving district 25c.

References

Democratic Party members of the Arizona House of Representatives